Che Yin Wong (born 13 May 1959) is a Hong Kong businessman and philanthropist. He is the founder and chairman of Kong Fung International Group, a property conglomerate with interests in properties, hotels, mining and constructions.

References

1959 births
Hong Kong businesspeople
Hong Kong philanthropists
Living people